= Paul M. Livingston =

- Born: 1976 (age 49–50)

Academic background
- Education: University of California, Irvine (PhD)
- Thesis: Experience and Structure: An Investigation in the History of Philosophy of Mind (2002)
- Doctoral advisor: David W. Smith

Academic work
- Era: Contemporary philosophy
- Region: Western philosophy
- Institutions: University of New Mexico

Paul Michael Livingston (born 1976) is a professor of philosophy at the University of New Mexico.

== Life and work ==
Livingston received his PhD from University of California, Irvine in 2002.

== Publications ==
- Livingston, Paul M. (2009). Philosophical History and the Problem of Consciousness. USA: Cambridge University Press. ISBN 978-0-521-12267-2.
- Bell, Jeffrey A.; Cutrofello, Andrew; Livingston, Paul M., eds. (2015-08-27). Beyond the Analytic-Continental Divide: Pluralist Philosophy in the Twenty-First Century (0 ed.). Routledge. doi:10.4324/9781315766621. ISBN 978-1-315-76662-1.
